Richard Lee Sneider (June 29, 1922 – August 16, 1986) was an American diplomat who served as United States Ambassador to South Korea and Deputy Assistant Secretary of State for East Asian Affairs.

Sneider served in the United States Army during World War II. He got his undergraduate degree from Brown University and a graduate degree from Columbia University. He held various assignments in Japan and at state department headquarters in Washington, D.C.

References

United States Social Security Death Index: Richard Sneider

1922 births
1986 deaths
Brown University alumni
Columbia University alumni
United States Army personnel of World War II
American expatriates in Japan
Ambassadors of the United States to South Korea